Parachydaeopsis is a genus of beetles in the family Cerambycidae, containing the following species:

 Parachydaeopsis laosica Breuning, 1968
 Parachydaeopsis shaanxiensis Wang & Chiang, 2002

References

Acanthocinini